This is a list of fictional railway stations, (as opposed to genuine railway stations portrayed in fictional works or context)

Branch line

England

Borsetshire
Downham – The Archers
Upper Croft – The Archers

Buckinghamshire
Hambleden – Candleshoe

Cornwall
Fal Vale Junction – The Ghost Train

Devon
Grimpen – The Hound of the Baskervilles

Dorset
Chufnell Regis – Jeeves and Wooster
Pepperinge Eye – Bedknobs and Broomsticks

Hampshire
Hamingwell Halt – The Great St Trinian's Train Robbery

Lake District
Rio – Swallows and Amazons
Strickland Junction – Swallows and Amazons

Lancashire
Ormston – Born and Bred

Norfolk
Arcady – Love on a Branch Line
Arcady Halt – Love on a Branch Line
Flaxfield – Love on a Branch Line

Somerset
Combe Florey Halt – The Flockton Flyer
Flockton – The Flockton Flyer
Lane End – The Flockton Flyer
Marlbury – To the Manor Born
Nettlecombe – The Flockton Flyer
Titfield-The Titfield Thunderbolt

Sussex
Beershorn – Cold Comfort Farm
Beershorn Halt – Cold Comfort Farm (film)
Godmere – Cold Comfort Farm

Yorkshire
Aidensfield – Heartbeat
Ailsenby – The Royal
Elsinby – The Royal

Ledby – Heartbeat
Mortonhurst – The Railway Children (2000)
Skellerton – Sam
Stacklepoole Junction – The Railway Children
Workdale – What a Carve Up!

Worcestershire

Austen-in-the-Wold – Oh, Doctor Beeching!
Bigglesby – Oh, Doctor Beeching!
Buston – Oh, Doctor Beeching!
Cogglethorpe – Oh, Doctor Beeching!
Coldhorton – Oh, Doctor Beeching!
Hatley – Oh, Doctor Beeching!
Loxley - Oh, Doctor Beeching!
Nether Padley – Oh, Doctor Beeching!
Nossington Bassett – Oh, Doctor Beeching!
Swinthorpe – Oh, Doctor Beeching!
Wenstead – Oh, Doctor Beeching!
Wetherton – Oh, Doctor Beeching!

Unknown
Bufflers Halt – The Secret Service
Little Weirwold – Goodnight Mister Tom

Scotland 
Auchenshoogle – Oor Wullie
Clachan of Inverstarve – The Glenmutchkin Railway
Glenbogle – Monarch of the Glen
Glenmutchkin – The Glenmutchkin Railway

Wales 
Grumbly – Ivor the Engine
Llangubbin – Ivor the Engine
Llaniog – Ivor the Engine
Llanmad – Ivor the Engine
Llantisilly – Ivor the Engine
Tan-y-Gwlch – Ivor the Engine

Northern Ireland 
Buggleskelly – Oh, Mr. Porter!

United States 
Fish's Switch – Speak Easily
Hooterville – Petticoat Junction
Pixley – Petticoat Junction

Main line

England

Holby

Holby Central - Casualty
Holby West - Casualty
Farmead Market - Casualty
Stokeville - Casualty

Barsetshire
Barchester – The Black Sheep of Whitehall

Borsetshire
Felpersham – The Archers
Hollerton Junction – The Archers

Greater London

Buckingham Palace – Churchill: The Hollywood Years
King's Cross railway station Platform 9 3/4 — Harry Potter films
Walford East - EastEnders
Charnham - Family Affairs

Hampshire
Fordbridge – The Great St Trinian's Train Robbery
Hamingwell – The Great St Trinian's Train Robbery
Nutcombe – The Great St Trinian's Train Robbery
Pudham  – The Great St Trinian's Train Robbery

Kent
Eastgate – Dad's Army
Snettlefold – Dad's Army
Walmington-on-Sea – Dad's Army

Lincolnshire
Cablethorpe – Hi-de-Hi!
Crimpton-on-Sea – Hi-de-Hi!
Moulton Junction – Hi-de-Hi!

Norfolk
Eastbeach – The Iron Way by C.M. Hincks (London: Nisbet & Co. Ltd, 1920) 
Eastwich – The Iron Way 
Marford Junction – The Iron Way
Southmouth – The Iron Way 
Tranbridge Junction – The Iron Way

Somerset
Mallingford – The Titfield Thunderbolt

Trumptonshire
Trumpton – Trumpton
Wintlebury – Chigley

Tyne and Wear
Gallowshield – When the Boat Comes In

Yorkshire
Bramall – The New Statesman
Downton – Downton Abbey
Kingsport – South Riding
Kiplington – South Riding
Skerrow – South Riding

Worcestershire
Clumberfield – Oh, Doctor Beeching!

Unknown
Barwell Heath – 4.50 from Paddington
Brackhampton – 4.50 from Paddington
Carvil Junction – 4.50 from Paddington
Chadmouth – 4.50 from Paddington
Chadwick – The Adventure of the Lost Locomotive
Frothington – Churchill: The Hollywood Years
Girton – The Adventure of the Lost Locomotive
Haling Broadway – 4.50 from Paddington
Kendon-on-Lea – The Adventure of the Lost Locomotive
Miggleswick – Oh, Mr. Porter!
Milchester – 4.50 from Paddington
Milford – Brief Encounter
Much Snogging On the Green – Carry On Loving
Mugby Junction – Mugby Junction
Roxeter – 4.50 from Paddington
Stillwell Street – The Warriors
Waverton – 4.50 from Paddington
Westcombe-on-Sea – Jeeves and Wooster
Whimperley – Dead Man's Mirror by Agatha Christie

Scotland 
Hogsmeade – Harry Potter series

Wales
Merioneth Central – Ivor the Engine
Tewyn – Ivor the Engine

United States

Kansas
Fort Leavenworth – Santa Fe Trail
Four Feather Falls – Four Feather Falls

Minnesota
Frostbite Falls – The Rocky and Bullwinkle Show

Mississippi
River Landing – Steamboat Bill, Jr.

Missouri
Midvale – Casey Jones

New Mexico
Hadleyville – High Noon

Texas
Desert Junction – Supertrain

Stations in unidentified states
Buffalo Valley – The Munsters
Indian Flats – The Munsters
Melton – Petticoat Junction
Rancho Relaxo – The Simpsons
Shelbyville – The Simpsons
Skidmore – Petticoat Junction
Springfield – The Simpsons

Austria
Gottlespiel Halt – Danger Mouse

Other
Edelweiss – Graustark novels by George Barr McCutcheon
Evergreen Station - The Raccoons
Frankenstein – Son of Frankenstein
Goldstadt – Bride of Frankenstein
Strelsau – The Prisoner of Zenda
Transylvania – Young Frankenstein

Monorail stations

Europe
Anderbad – Thunderbirds
Monte Carlo – Captain Scarlet and the Mysterons

United States
Brockway – The Simpsons
North Haverbrook – The Simpsons
Ogdenville – The Simpsons
Springfield – The Simpsons

Rapid transport stations

Stations on atmospheric railways 
Van Horne – Ghostbusters II
Scratch Row – The Springheel Saga

Island of Sodor 
See:
North Western Railway
Skarloey Railway
Culdee Fell Railway
Arlesdale Railway
Sodor & Mainland Railway

See also 

 List of fictional rapid transit stations

Sources

Further reading
Huntley, John Railways in the Cinema. London: Ian Allan 

Railway stations
+
Fictional